Olive "Ollie" Smith (17 May 1923 in Belmore, New South Wales – 14 February 2014 in Caringbah, New South Wales) was an Australian cricket player. Smith played four test matches for the Australia national women's cricket team.

Smith played her first match for the New South Wales women's cricket team in its 1946/47 season. She was later a sports administrator.

References

1923 births
2014 deaths
Australia women Test cricketers